Ganesh Bhikaji Deolalikar (1895-1978) was an Indian architect and designed the main 1958 wing of the Supreme Court of India Building.

Born in Bombay Presidency in 1895, Deolalikar was the first Indian to head the Central Public Works Department.

References

1895 births
1978 deaths
20th-century Indian architects
Indian civil servants
People from Gujarat